Jed Fish may refer to:
Jed the Fish (born 1955), disc jockey
Jedd Fisch (born 1976), American football coach